Natalia Vladimirovna Zuyeva (born October 10, 1988) is a Russian rhythmic gymnast. She is the 2008 Olympic champion in the group all-around.

Career 
Zuyeva won gold in the group all-around at the 2006 European Rhythmic Gymnastics Championships in Moscow. She then won gold medals at the 2007 World Championships in Patras, Greece and the 2008 Summer Olympics in Beijing, China.

Zuyeva has also competed in Latin dance competitions in Russia and northern Europe.

Personal life 
Zuyeva lives in Belgorod.

Detailed Olympic results

References

External links
 

1988 births
Living people
People from Belgorod
Russian rhythmic gymnasts
Gymnasts at the 2008 Summer Olympics
Olympic gymnasts of Russia
Olympic gold medalists for Russia
Olympic medalists in gymnastics
Medalists at the 2008 Summer Olympics
Medalists at the Rhythmic Gymnastics World Championships
Medalists at the Rhythmic Gymnastics European Championships
Sportspeople from Belgorod Oblast
21st-century Russian women